The Isle of Man Railway Cup, also known as the Cu-Plas Railway Cup for sponsorship reasons, is an association football tournament held for the top four clubs from the Isle of Man Premier League, the top flight in Isle of Man football. The tournament is held annually, traditionally on Boxing Day, where the top four sides of the league table at that time compete for the trophy. The tournament has been running since 1925 and is overseen by the Isle of Man Football Association.

In 2011, the trophy was sent to Sheffield Silverware in England for repairs. The Isle of Man FA Chief Executive Frank Stennett said that this was because "Over the course of time it has picked up a few knocks and bumps."

References 

Football competitions in the Isle of Man